Great Missenden railway station serves the village of Great Missenden in Buckinghamshire, England and the neighbouring villages of Prestwood, Little Hampden and Little Missenden. The station lies on the London Marylebone - Aylesbury line and is served by Chiltern Railways trains. It is between Amersham and  stations.

Both station platforms have step-free access.

History
The station was opened on 1 September 1892 by the Metropolitan Railway (Met), when its railway was extended from Chalfont Road to Aylesbury Town. The Great Central Railway served the station from 1899, linking the station with Leicester, Nottingham, and Sheffield.

When London Underground's Metropolitan line (the successor of the Met) was fully electrified in the late 1950s and early 1960s, a decision was made to run only as far as Amersham. This meant that Great Missenden was henceforth now only served by main line services; following the end of steam-hauled Metropolitan line trains in 1961 the service was provided by British Rail Class 115 diesel multiple units until 1992 (which were then replaced by the line's current rolling stock). Responsibility for the station (and the railway north of Amersham to Aylesbury) was transferred from London Transport to British Railways on 11 September 1961; British Railways signage gradually replaced that of the London Underground.

In 1966 as a result of The Reshaping of British Railways report, British Railways closed the line north of Aylesbury and the station is now only served by local commuter services. British Rail ran services until privatisation in 1996, when Chiltern Railways took over the franchise.

During the modernisation of the Met in the 1950s, the down (Aylesbury) platform buildings were demolished. In 1989-90 BR's Network SouthEast refurbished the station and the "up" (London) platform canopy was shortened slightly.

A Metropolitan Railway signal box used to stand at the south end of the down platform. It ended service in 1984, and was finally removed in 2010 to be used at the Mid Hants Railway as an exhibit.

Many Prime Ministers have used the station when travelling to and from their weekend residence, Chequers.

Services
At peak times there are up to four trains per hour to London in the morning, and returning from London (towards Aylesbury) in the evening. Some are express services that omit the stops shared with the Metropolitan line nearer London.

Journeys to Marylebone take about 45 minutes (35 minutes for express trains). Journeys to Aylesbury take about 15 minutes.

The normal service pattern is as follows:
2 trains per hour to Aylesbury
1 train per hour continues on to Aylesbury Vale Parkway
2 trains per hour to London Marylebone

Onward Connections

Buses operate from the station to High Wycombe and an infrequent service to Chesham (twice per week), run by Arriva Shires & Essex.

Cultural use
The station is used in television or film from time to time, as its typical South-East English decor and easily removable name signs mean it can be adapted without too much difficulty.
An advert for the BBC's Great Britons TV programme showed Mo Mowlam standing beneath the name sign asking "Why is Great Missenden Great?"

References

External links

  Chiltern Railways website
 Photos of Great Missenden Station

Metropolitan line stations
Railway stations in Buckinghamshire
Former Metropolitan and Great Central Joint Railway stations
Railway stations in Great Britain opened in 1892
Railway stations served by Chiltern Railways
Great Missenden